Sajdak is a Polish surname. Notable people with the surname include:

 Przemysław Sajdak (born 2000), Polish footballer (midfielder)
 Tomasz Sajdak (born 1984), retired Polish footballer (striker and midfielder)
 Pat Sajak (born Patrick Sajdak; born 1946), American television personality and game show host

Surnames of Polish origin